Noriaki Yamada ( Yamada Noriaki; 8 October 1951 – 10 March 2023) was a Japanese politician.

Yamada died from head injuries sustained in a fall in Hakusan, on 10 March 2023. He was 71.

References

1951 births
2023 deaths
21st-century Japanese politicians
Liberal Democratic Party (Japan) politicians
Politicians from Ishikawa Prefecture